Mi esposa se divorcia is a Mexican telenovela produced by Televisa and originally transmitted by Telesistema Mexicano.

Cast 
 Lucy Gallardo
 Rafael Banquells
 Andrea Palma
 Bertha Moss
 Mercedes Pascual
 Pilar Souza
 Regina Llergo
 Luis Beristain
 Malena Doria
 Miguel Suárez
 Silvia Caos
 Roberto Meyer
 Silvia Suárez
 Amparo Villegas
 José Antonio Cossío

References

External links 

Mexican telenovelas
Televisa telenovelas
1959 telenovelas
1959 Mexican television series debuts
1959 Mexican television series endings
Spanish-language telenovelas